Umrao Jaan is a 2006 Indian Hindustani-language musical romantic drama film produced and directed by J. P. Dutta, based on the Urdu novel Umrao Jaan Ada and is about the famous courtesan of the title. Aishwarya Rai stars in the lead role along with Abhishek Bachchan, Shabana Azmi, Sunil Shetty, Divya Dutta, Himani Shivpuri and Kulbhushan Kharbanda in supporting roles.

Produced on a budget of 150 million, Umrao Jaan was released on 3 November 2006 in 600700 screens worldwide and grossed 195.2 million.

Plot
In 1840, a girl named Amiran (Aishwarya Rai) is kidnapped from her home in Faizabad by Dilawar Khan (Vishwajeet Pradhan) who had been sent to jail based upon the evidence presented by Amiran's father. To take his revenge, he kidnaps Amiran and sells her to a brothel in Lucknow run by Khannum Jaan (Shabana Azmi). Bua Hussaini (Himani Shivpuri) and Maulvi Sahib (Kulbhushan Kharbanda) adopt Amiran and treat her as their own daughter. In the company of Khurshid (Ayesha Jhulka), Bismillah (Divya Dutta), and one of the courtesan's sons, Gauhar Mirza (Puru Raaj Kumar), Amiran learns the art of being a courtesan, or tawaif.

The girl turns into an elegant, poetic beauty by the name of Umrao Jaan (Aishwarya Rai). Umrao's beauty and poetry are enough to catch the eye of Nawab Sultan (Abhishek Bachchan). The two begin a passionate romance. Though Nawab's wealth grants him exclusivity, he is worried that Umrao may still offer her charms to other men - an accusation she detests. The lovers share blissful moments, but when Nawab's father hears of their relationship, he disowns the son from his life, wealth, and property. The penniless Nawab goes to stay in the house of his uncle, who is a judge in Ghari, to sort himself out; Umrao is left desolate without him and prays every day for his return.

In the Nawab's absence, Umrao catches the eye of Faiz Ali (Sunil Shetty). Though she rejects his romantic advances, he determinedly pursues her and eventually asks her to accompany him to his home in Daulatabad. Umrao accepts, but only after she learns that they will be traveling through Ghari. Along the way, the whole party is arrested after a confrontation between Faiz Ali's men and a group of state soldiers. Faiz Ali is revealed to be a dacoit whom the soldiers have pursued for years. Nawab Sultan hears that Umrao and Faiz Ali are in Ghari and goes to meet Faiz Ali in prison. Faiz Ali, who then realizes that Umrao only accompanied him so that she could meet Nawab, manipulates the information concerning his time with Umrao and implies to the Nawab that they had a sexual relationship. The Nawab confronts Umrao and, feeling that she betrayed him, shuns her and sends her back to Lucknow. Umrao does not clarify the obvious misunderstanding, remembering a vow Nawab has taken to never insult her with accusations of infidelity and feeling that his failure to keep the promise has destroyed their love anyway. Heartbroken, she returns to her old life, but fate has other plans for her.

In a drunken state, Umrao's childhood friend Gauhar Mirza (Puru Raaj Kumar), who has always been in love with her, becomes frustrated at her for rejecting his advances and rapes her. Soon after, the British attack the city, and she is forced to leave Lucknow. She and the refugees separate after she decides to go to Faizabad, her childhood home. There, she learns that her father is long dead. She meets her mother and brother, but they refuse to accept her because of her profession. Umrao, rejected by her family and her lover, leaves to return to Lucknow. Then, fate plays another joke on her: on her way out of the city, she encounters Dilawar Khan, the man who had kidnapped her and sold her to the brothel when she was a child. Poor, wretched, homeless, injured, and infected with leprosy, he begs Umrao for money, not recognizing who she is. She gives him her gold bangles and prays to God for his forgiveness. Ostracized by all and having forgiven those who destroyed her life, Umrao lives out the rest of her days in Lucknow with her poetry and ill fate.

Cast
 Aishwarya Rai as Amiran (Umrao Jaan)
 Abhishek Bachchan as Nawab
 Shabana Azmi as Khanum Jaan
 Sunil Shetty as Faiz Ali
 Divya Dutta as Bismillah
 Himani Shivpuri as Bua Hussaini
 Puru Raaj Kumar as Gauhar Mirza
 Kulbhushan Kharbanda as Maulvi Sahib
 Ayesha Jhulka as Khurshid
 Bikram Saluja as Ashraf (Nawab Sultan's friend)
 Parikshat Sahni as Umrao's father
 Maya Alagh as Umrao's mother
 Vishwajeet Pradhan as Dilawar Khan (Amiran's abductor)
 Javed Khan as Peer Baksh (Dilawar Khan's accomplice)
Vimarsh Roshan
 Bansree Madhani as Amiran (the young Umrao)
Alexandre boisvert as sultan khan

Production
According to Dutta the film is based on the script written by his father O. P. Dutta, which in turn was adapted from the classic Urdu novel Umrao Jan Ada by Mirza Hadi Ruswa. The film was shot on location including some palaces from Jaipur. Saroj Khan was selected to choreograph the dances, but backed out owing to disagreements with director J. P. Dutta. She was replaced by Vaibhavi Merchant.

Several of the roles were changed during pre-production. Priyanka Chopra was considered to play the part of Umrao Jaan, but could not allot the ninety consecutive dates required for shooting due to her prior commitments in Bluffmaster! (2005). Arshad Warsi was to star in the film as Gauhar Mirza, but dropped out soon after as he chose to appear in Lage Raho Munna Bhai (2006). Subsequently, Puru Raaj Kumar replaced Warsi. Shabana Azmi, who plays the role of Khannum Jaan, is the daughter of Shaukat Azmi, who played the same role in the 1981 version. Saif Ali Khan was approached for the role of Nawab Sultan in the film along with Akshaye Khanna in Faiz Ali's role, but both declined the film due to other projects. This led to Abhishek Bachchan replacing Saif Ali Khan, and Sunil Shetty replacing Akshaye Khanna.

Soundtrack 

The music is by Anu Malik and the lyrics by Javed Akhtar. The full album is recorded by Alka Yagnik, Anmol Malik, Richa Sharma and Sonu Nigam, and was released on T-Series label. Malik's daughter Anmol Malik made her singing debut with this album, she rendered her voice for "Agle Janam Mohe Bitya (Reprise)".

Reception
The film performed poorly at the box office, grossing only Rs. 6,49,00,000. The film received negative reviews from critics. Many of them reacted unfavourably to J. P. Dutta's direction and the film's three-hour running time, and several critics panned it while comparing it to the highly acclaimed 1981 version directed by Muzaffar Ali.

BBC film critic Poonam Joshi concluded, "J. P. Dutta's film is an Ash-fest that adds little to the legacy of Umrao Jaan." She praised Azmi's performance as "exemplary" and wrote about Rai, "While only Rai could emulate the grace and poise of Rekha, she doesn't quite capture the intensity of Umrao's abiding melancholy", later commenting that "her incandescent beauty and artistry... does indeed keep the audience watching, though not necessarily emotionally engaged." Describing Rai's performance, Nikhat Kazmi wrote, "she's riveting in places, diligent throughout and tries so hard to recreate a lost world of grandeur that your heart almost goes out to her." while Rediff gave two and a half rating out of five and wrote "there is Rai the star, queen and saving grace of Umrao Jaan. She enthralls with her gorgeousness, the precision in her dance movements, elegance in her gestures and sincerity in her willingness to become Umrao Jaan".

Susan Muthalaly from The Hindu wrote, "Umrao Jaan remains a spectacle that does nothing for you, personally." She wrote about Rai, "You'd think that since she's playing someone so close to her real life, there would be real feeling in the performance. But remember, this is a realistic performance, so Rai stays true to her real life character and shows no genuine emotion for most of the film. She dances like a dream, but her range of emotions is limited." Another review in The Hindu said, "Umrao Jaan of 2006 would be at best remembered as a poor man's remake of a classic or a love story with a period flavour."

The Tribune concluded that "Umrao Jaan fails to impress" and while referring to Rai's performance wrote, "She is no match to Rekha". Seena Menon of Deccan Herald said, "Unfortunately, watching 19th-century Lucknow in the 2006 version of Umrao Jaan gives you nothing but a feeling akin to staring at a glass model of the original."

Kathakali Jana from Hindustan Times wrote, "Though comparing the film with the 1981 magnum opus is not fair, what does one do with a baggage of incredible weight? One simply remembers it again and decides to go back to it once more." Similarly, Jana wrote about Rai that she "looks lovely when she smiles. She looks lovelier when she cries. Dutta's screenplay – which runs into 180 excruciating minutes – allows her to do both in good measure. But where is the celebrated 19th century tawaif of Lucknow whose untold sufferings could do nothing to strip her of her dignity?"

Ziya Us Salam wrote for the same newspaper in a more positive review, "At its soul, body, even content, this Umrao Jaan is as beautiful as its leading lady (Rai), the one who once had the world at her feet." Gullu Singh, another reviewer for Rediff, praised the film for being more loyal to the novel."

Worldwide, the film has grossed Rs. 19.52 crore, including $485,000 at the U.S. box office.

References

External links
 

Indian epic films
2006 films
2000s Hindi-language films
2000s Urdu-language films
Films set in Lucknow
Films about courtesans in India
Films scored by Anu Malik
Films directed by J. P. Dutta
Films shot in Lucknow
Films based on Indian novels